Freedom of Information Act may refer to the following legislations in different jurisdictions which mandate the national government to disclose certain data to the general public upon request:
 Freedom of Information Act (United States) of 1966
 Freedom of Information Act 1982, the Australian act
 Freedom of Information Act 2000, the UK act
 Freedom of Information (Scotland) Act 2002
 Freedom of Information Act in Pakistan
 Freedom of Information Act (Illinois)

See also
 Freedom of information laws by country